David Morris may refer to:

Entertainment
 Dave Morris (actor) (1884–1955), American film actor of the silent era
 David Morris (actor) (1924–2007), English painter and actor
 Dave Morris (comedian) (1896–1960), English music hall comedian
 Hearty White, aka David Morris, musician
 Dave Morris (writer) (born 1957), British author of gamebooks, novels, comics, computer games
 David Morris (author), writer and scholar, emeritus professor of literature at the University of Virginia
 David Morris (writer), American author and Vice-President of the Institute for Local Self-Reliance
 David J. Morris, American writer and former Marine infantry officer

Politics
 David Morris (Whig politician) (1800–1864), Member of Parliament for Carmarthen, 1837–64
 David Morris (Wisconsin politician) (1849–1914), American farmer and politician
 David Morris (Labour politician) (1930–2007), Welsh politician and member of the European Parliament
 David Morris (Australian politician) (born 1955), Australian politician and member of the Victorian Legislative Assembly
 David Morris (Conservative politician) (born 1966), member of the UK House of Commons elected 2010

Sports
 David Morris (English footballer) (1888–?), English footballer in the 1910s
 David Morris (Scottish footballer) (1897–1971), Raith Rovers FC and Scotland player
 David Morris (footballer, born 1957), Welsh professional footballer
 David Hyman Morris (1897–1985), English footballer
 David Morris (soccer) (born 1978), Canadian soccer defender
 David Morris (skier) (born 1984), Australian 2014 Olympic Aerial Skiing Silver Medallist

Other
 David Morris (jeweller), British jeweller
 David Morris (snooker player) (born 1988), Irish snooker player
 David Morris (United States Army officer), American general
 David Morris, one of the two defendants in the McLibel case
 David Morris, convicted of the Clydach murders

See also
Dave Hennen Morris (1872–1944), American lawyer, diplomat and racehorse owner
David Maurice (1626–1702), Welsh Anglican priest and translator